The al-Ashtar Brigades (Saraya al-Ashtar, named after Malik al-Ashtar), or AAB for short, is a Shiite militant group in Bahrain designated as a terrorist organization by the governments of Bahrain, Egypt, Saudi Arabia, United Arab Emirates, United States and Canada.

Terrorist designation

In June 2017, the al-Ashtar Brigades were designated as terrorist organizations by Bahrain, Egypt, the UAE and Saudi Arabia. The United States Department of State has designated the group as a terrorist organization, as of July 2018. Canada classified the Brigades as a terrorist organization in 2019.

Ideology

The al-Ashtar Brigades has stated that it is loyal to the government of Iran, and has adopted branding consistent with the Iranian Revolutionary Guard Corps.

Attacks
The group has reportedly claimed responsibility for over 20 attacks in Bahrain, primarily targeting police and security forces.

The group was designated a terrorist organization by Bahrain following a 2014 bombing in Al Daih which killed three policemen.

In 2017, a security officer was killed by an AAB attack in Manama.

References

Organizations based in Asia designated as terrorist
Organizations designated as terrorist by Bahrain
Organizations designated as terrorist by Canada
Organizations designated as terrorist by Egypt
Organizations designated as terrorist by Saudi Arabia
Organizations designated as terrorist by the United States
Organisations designated as terrorist by the United Kingdom
Organizations designated as terrorist by the United Arab Emirates
Khomeinist groups
Axis of Resistance
Islamism in Bahrain